Zuberi Katwila (born 11 October 1982) is a Tanzanian football midfielder who played for Mtibwa Sugar. He was a squad member for the 1997 COSAFA Cup and the 2002 CECAFA Cup.

References

1982 births
Living people
Tanzanian footballers
Tanzania international footballers
Mtibwa Sugar F.C. players
Association football midfielders
Tanzanian Premier League players